Toad in the hole or sausage toad is a traditional English dish consisting of sausages in Yorkshire pudding batter, usually served with onion gravy and vegetables. Historically, the dish has also been prepared using other meats, such as rump steak and lamb's kidney.

Origins
Batter puddings became popular in the early 18th century. Cookery writer Jennifer Stead has drawn attention to a description of a recipe identical to toad in the hole from the middle of the century. At this time, Northerners tended to use dripping to make their puddings crispier, whereas Southerners made softer Yorkshire puddings.

Dishes like toad in the hole appeared in print as early as 1762, where it was described as a "vulgar" name for a "small piece of beef baked in a large pudding". Toad in the hole was originally created as a way to stretch out meat in poor households. Chefs therefore suggested using the cheapest meats in this dish. In 1747, for example, Hannah Glasse's The Art of Cookery listed a recipe for "pigeon in a hole", calling for pigeon rather than the contemporary sausages. In 1861 Isabella Beeton listed a similar recipe using rump steak and lamb's kidney, while Charles Elmé Francatelli's 1852 recipe mentions "6d. or 1s." worth of any kind of cheap meat. This recipe was described as "English cooked-again stewed meat" (lesso rifatto all'inglese) or "toad in the Hole", in the first book of modern Italian cuisine, which stressed that meat was to be leftover from stews and re-cooked in batter.

Name 
The dish with leftover meat was originally not called toad in the hole. In the 1787 book A Provincial Glossary by Francis Grose, for example, "toad in a hole" was referred to as "meat boiled in a crust", though a September 28, 1765 passage in The Newcastle Chronicle reads, "No, you shall lay on the common side of the world; like a toad in a hole that is bak'd for the Devil's dinner". The first mention of the word "hole", outside of Pigeons in a Hole found in the cookbook by Hannah Glasse, appeared in the 1900 publication Notes & Queries, which described the dish as a "batter-pudding with a hole in the middle containing meat". Despite popular belief, there is no record of the dish ever being made with toad. The origin of the name is unclear, but it may refer to the way toads wait for their prey in their burrows, making their heads visible in the earth, just like the sausages peep through the batter. It may also derive from the "entombed animal" phenomenon of live frogs or toads being found encased in stone, which was a scientific fad of the late 18th century.

The term is sometimes used for “egg in the basket”, (an egg fried in a hole of a slice of bread).

See also 

 Corn dog
 English cuisine
 List of meat dishes
 List of sausage dishes

References

External links 

English sausages
English cuisine
Meat dishes
Sausage dishes